Kodai or Kōdai may refer to:

Kōdai (given name), a masculine Japanese given name
Kōdai or Takadai, a frame used for making kumihimo, a type of Japanese braid
Kodaikanal, s a hill station which is located in Dindigul district in the state of Tamil Nadu, India
Kodai (2023), Tamil film directed by Raajaselvam